Bae Doona (born October 11, 1979; also credited as Doona Bae), is a South Korean actress and photographer. She became known outside Korea for her roles as a political activist in Park Chan-wook's Sympathy for Mr. Vengeance (2002), archer Park Nam-joo in Bong Joon-ho's The Host (2006), and as the doll in Hirokazu Kore-eda's Air Doll (2009). She has had English-speaking roles in the Wachowski films Cloud Atlas (2012) and Jupiter Ascending (2015), as well as their Netflix television series Sense8 (2015–2018). As for her Korean-speaking roles, she is well known for playing the leading female character in the Netflix period zombie thriller, Kingdom (2019–present), as well as the crime thriller Stranger (2017-2020) and sci-fi The Silent Sea.

Early life 
Bae Doona was born in Seoul, South Korea. Growing up, she would follow her mother, Kim Hwa-young, a stage actress, to theater and rehearsal halls, learning lines of dialogue as she went along. This did not initially lead her toward acting, saying: "People might say that since my mother is a theater actor, I became an actress. But to me, those experiences probably had the opposite effect. On the contrary, because I saw many great actors working with my mother, I thought this was a job only people with extraordinary talent could do."

Career

1998–2005: Beginnings
A Konkuk University student in 1998, she was scouted by a modeling agency in Seoul. This led to her modeling of clothing for COOLDOG's catalog, among others. In 1999, she switched to acting before completing her studies at university, debuting in the TV drama School. Later that year, she appeared as the ghost in The Ring Virus, a Korean remake of the Japanese horror film Ring.

In 2000, director Bong Joon-ho cast Doona in the film Barking Dogs Never Bite for her willingness to do the part without makeup, something other South Korean actresses refused to do. She later cited this part as the role that pushed her to pursue a serious acting career, saying, "That film made me decide to become an actress –- a good actress –- and that film thereby changed my whole life." In Kim So-young's documentary Women's History Trilogy (2000–2004), she expressed her admiration for veteran South Korean actress Yoon Jeong-hee. In the same documentary, Bae said her own most memorable scene was being chased by the homeless man throughout the apartment in Barking Dogs Never Bite. That same year, she gave a risque performance (albeit with a body double for the more intense scenes) in Plum Blossom, and started getting more work on television.

This was followed by 2001's Take Care of My Cat, directed by Jeong Jae-eun, and 2002's Sympathy for Mr. Vengeance, directed by Park Chan-wook.

In 2003, both Tube and Spring Bears Love disappointed at the box office. After completing principal photography on Spring Bears Love, she decided to take time off from film work, saying, "I never lived even once without having anything to do. The moment a film was presented to the media, I was almost always already shooting the next one [...] I thought by myself: now my first cycle is really over. While I rest a little, I wanted to make a fresh start."

During her hiatus from film, she took up photography, examples of which can be seen on her official blog and in her published photo-essay books. She also continued to work on TV, starring in Country Princess and Rosemary. Bae acted on stage in 2004 in a production of Sunday Seoul (not to be confused with the South Korean movie of the same title), a play co-written by Park Chan-wook.

In 2005, she played an exchange student who joins a band in the Japanese film Linda Linda Linda, then played a divorced woman in the experimental omnibus TV series Beating Heart.

2006–present: Breakthrough success

She reunited with Bong Joon-ho in 2006's The Host, which became the highest-grossing film in South Korean box office history. For her role, she trained in archery for months. She then returned to television, through the series Someday and How to Meet a Perfect Neighbor.

After winning accolades for Air Doll, a 2009 film by Japanese director Hirokazu Kore-eda about an inflatable doll that develops consciousness and falls in love, Bae made back-to-back TV series in 2010, playing a high school teacher in Master of Study, and a night club singer in Gloria.

Her 2012 sports film As One was based on the true story of the 1991 world table tennis championship held in Chiba, Japan where North Korean player Ri Bun-hui and South Korean player Hyun Jung-hwa defeated the Chinese team. Bae and co-star Ha Ji-won were trained by Hyun herself, and Bae learned to play left-handed like Ri. Afterwards she made a brief appearance in the science fiction film Doomsday Book.

Bae made her English-language, Hollywood debut in Cloud Atlas, as Sonmi~451, a clone in a dystopian Korea. She also played the minor roles of Tilda Ewing, the wife of an abolitionist in pre-Civil War America, and a Mexican woman who crosses paths with an assassin. Co-directed by The Wachowskis and Tom Tykwer, the  adaptation of David Mitchell's novel premiered at the 2012 Toronto International Film Festival to divisive reviews, though Bae's performance was praised by critics. In a 2019 interview, she said of the Wachowskis, "They have become as important as my mother; they have my respect and my trust. When they contacted me to participate in Cloud Atlas, I couldn’t believe it. We first met on Skype and I made a demo tape that I sent them. They gave me an important role despite my lack of English proficiency. I believe that a certain understanding developed between us at that time, which pushed me to follow them on Sense8. Thanks to them, I have had opportunities that are not given to all the actors. Most importantly, it is the passion they bring to their work that has made our collaboration so enjoyable. They made me want to surpass myself and enabled me to overcome fear and limits."

Back in Korea, Bae next starred in the 2014 film A Girl at My Door, directed by July Jung and produced by Lee Chang-dong. Playing a small-town police officer who tries to save a mysterious young girl she suspects is a victim of domestic violence, Bae said she was so fascinated by the story and emotionally challenging role that she decided to star in the movie without pay three hours after reading the script. The film premiered in the Un Certain Regard section of the 2014 Cannes Film Festival, and Bae later won Best Actress at the Asian Film Awards for her performance.

In 2015, she again worked with the Wachowskis for their space opera Jupiter Ascending, in which she played a small supporting role as a bounty hunter. This was followed by Sense8, an American science fiction series created by the Wachowskis and co-written by J. Michael Straczynski. Concerning eight strangers from different cultures and parts of the world who share a violent psychic vision and suddenly find themselves telepathically connected, Sense8 began streaming on Netflix in 2015.

Bae then appeared in a 90-minute web film directed by her older brother, commercial director Bae Doo-han. Titled Red Carpet Dream, it is a biopic of how Bae dreamed of becoming an actress when she was young and her 20-year acting career. Commissioned for the 20th anniversary of the Busan International Film Festival and sponsored by MAC Cosmetics, the film screened at the festival as well as on Facebook and cable channel CGV.

Back on the big screen, Bae starred alongside Ha Jung-woo in the survival drama film The Tunnel. She then teamed up with Japanese director Shunji Iwai and actor Kim Joo-hyuk for the short film, Chang-ok's Letter.

Bae returned to Korean TV screens in 2017 with crime thriller Stranger, playing the passionate yet empathetic police officer Lieutenant Han Yeo-jin, contrasting Cho Seung-woo's character Prosecutor Hwang Si-mok. The series was a huge success and gained positive reviews for its tight plot, gripping sequences and strong performances. The series was renewed for a second season in 2020, with her character promoted to the rank of Senior Inspector.

In June 2018, Bae was one of 14 professionals from the Korean film industry invited to join the Academy of Motion Picture Arts and Sciences (AMPAS). The same year, she starred in crime thriller The Drug King. She also starred in both seasons of the 2019 Netflix period zombie series Kingdom, and romance drama Matrimonial Chaos, a remake of the Japanese television series of the same name.

Bae also starred in a French-speaking role in the romcom #JeSuisLa in 2019, starring alongside Alain Chabat. She was cast in the 2021 Netflix sci-fi thriller The Silent Sea, alongside Gong Yoo, Lee Moo-saeng and Kim Sun-young. In 2022, she returned to the big screen with two films: Jung Ju-ri's Next Sohee, and Hirokazu Kore-eda's Broker.

On March 3, 2023, Bae signed with Goodman Story Entertainment.

Filmography

Film

Television series

Web series

Music video appearances

Hosting

Theater

Discography

Books

Awards and nominations

References

External links 

  
 

Living people
Actresses from Seoul
South Korean film actresses
South Korean photographers
South Korean television actresses
South Korean stage actresses
20th-century South Korean actresses
21st-century South Korean actresses
South Korean women photographers
Konkuk University alumni
Best Actress Asian Film Award winners
21st-century women photographers
1979 births
Best Actress Paeksang Arts Award (film) winners